Arthur Wontner (21 January 1875 – 10 July 1960) was a British actor best known for playing Sir Arthur Conan Doyle's master detective Sherlock Holmes in five films from 1931 to 1937.

Career

Wontner's acting career began on the stage where he played such roles as Tybalt in Romeo and Juliet, Bassanio in The Merchant of Venice, Bunny Manders in Raffles, the Amateur Cracksman and Cardinal Richelieu in The Three Musketeers (1930, West End). In 1926, Wontner appeared in The Captive alongside Basil Rathbone, both of whom went on to play Sherlock Holmes on film.

Sherlock Holmes

Wontner landed the role of Sherlock Holmes thanks to his performance of Holmes imitation Sexton Blake in a 1930 stage production. He played the famed sleuth in five films from 1931 to 1937.

The Sleeping Cardinal (1931) (US title: Sherlock Holmes' Fatal Hour), based on Doyle's two stories, "The Final Problem" and "The Adventure of the Empty House"
The Missing Rembrandt (1932) (still considered lost), based on "The Adventure of Charles Augustus Milverton"
The Sign of Four: Sherlock Holmes' Greatest Case (1932)
The Triumph of Sherlock Holmes (1935), based on The Valley of Fear
Silver Blaze (1937) (US title: Murder at the Baskervilles, release 1941), based on "The Adventure of Silver Blaze"

Of the five films in which Wontner portrayed Sherlock Holmes, The Missing Rembrandt is no longer available. It is officially a lost film.

Silver Blaze was renamed Murder at the Baskervilles on its US release in order to make the most of the publicity which had been generated by Basil Rathbone's version of The Hound of the Baskervilles.

After seeing The Sleeping Cardinal, Vincent Starrett said "Surely no better Sherlock Holmes than Arthur Wontner is likely to be seen and heard in pictures, in our time."

Personal life

Wontner's son became the well-known hotelier and Lord Mayor of London Sir Hugh Wontner.

Selected filmography

 Temptation's Hour (1916)
 Lady Windermere's Fan (1916) - Lord Darlington
 The Bigamist (1916) - Tony Henderson
 Bonnie Prince Charlie (1923) - Lord Kingsburgh
 Eugene Aram (1924) - Eugene Aram
 The Diamond Man (1924) - Lady Marshalt
 The Infamous Lady (1928) - The K.C.
 The Sleeping Cardinal (1931) - Sherlock Holmes
 A Gentleman of Paris (1931) - Judge Le Fevre
 Condemned to Death (1932) - Sir Charles Wallington
 The Missing Rembrandt (1932) - Sherlock Holmes
 The Sign of Four (1932) - Sherlock Holmes
 The Triumph of Sherlock Holmes (1935) - Sherlock Holmes
 Royal Cavalcade (1935) - Minor Role (uncredited)
 Line Engaged (1935) - Insp. Morland
 Dishonour Bright (1936) - Judge
 Second Bureau (1936) - Col. Gueraud
 Thunder in the City (1937) - Sir Peter
 Storm in a Teacup (1937) - Fiscal
 Silver Blaze (1937) - Sherlock Holmes
 The Live Wire (1937) - Montell
 Just like a Woman (1938) - Escubar
 The Terror (1938) - Col. Redmayne
 13 Men and a Gun (1938) - Captain
 Kate Plus Ten (1938) - Colonel Westhanger
 Old Iron (1938) - Judge
 The Life and Death of Colonel Blimp (1943) - Embassy Counsellor
 Blanche Fury (1948) - Lord Rudford
 The Elusive Pimpernel (1950) - Lord Grenville
 Brandy for the Parson (1952) - Major Glockleigh
 Genevieve (1953) - Old Gentleman
 Sea Devils (1953) - Baron de Baudrec
 Three Cases of Murder (1955) - Leader of the House (segment "Lord Mountdrago") (uncredited) (final film role)

References

External links

 

1875 births
1960 deaths
English male film actors
English male silent film actors
Male actors from London
20th-century English male actors